Ulf Gösta Nilsson (born 11 May 1950) is a Swedish former professional ice hockey player who played in the World Hockey Association (WHA) for the Winnipeg Jets and in the National Hockey League (NHL) for the New York Rangers. Nilsson won 2 Avco World Trophies as WHA champions with the Winnipeg Jets.

Career in North America
Part of the first major wave of Europeans to star in North American hockey, he was a major star in the World Hockey Association from 1974 to 1978. He scored at least 114 points in each of his four seasons in the upstart league, finishing third or fourth among overall scorers every time. He led the WHA with 85 assists in 1976–77, and tied Marc Tardif for the lead the next season with 89. Along with countryman Anders Hedberg and established superstar Bobby Hull, he played a starring role as the Jets won Avco Cup titles in 1976 and 1978. In the 1976 playoffs, he scored 26 points in just 13 games and was named WHA Playoff MVP.

In the summer of 1978, Nilsson and Hedberg signed with the National Hockey League's New York Rangers for $2.4 million, further weakening the struggling WHA which would cease operations after just one more season. Nilsson's NHL career was marred by two significant injuries. The first was a broken ankle suffered when his skate blade got caught in a crevice in the Madison Square Garden ice as he was hit by Denis Potvin of the New York Islanders, which resulted in Nilsson bearing the entire force of the hit on only one leg. Although Nilsson has never characterized the hit as dirty and, in 2009, said, "He [Potvin] was always fair. But the ice was never great in the Garden, because they had basketball and other events. My foot got caught. It was a freak thing," the incident is nevertheless commemorated by the "Potvin Sucks" chant that takes place during every Rangers home game.

As a player of NHL All-Stars team, Nilsson took part in the 1979 Challenge Cup, where they played against the Soviet Union national team.

Nilsson's second serious injury was to his knee while representing Sweden at the 1981 Canada Cup which caused him to miss the entire 1981–82 season. Nilsson was limited to 160 games in his three full seasons with the Rangers, though he scored an impressive 163 points in that time. He scored 8 goals and 16 points in the 1980–81 playoffs as the Rangers advanced to the semi-finals before being eliminated by their local rivals, the defending champion Islanders. After missing the previous season, he returned to the Rangers lineup for ten games early in the 1982–83 season.

Use of banned substances
Nilsson tested positive for ephedrine after Sweden's 4–1 victory over Poland on 6 April 1974, at the 1974 World Ice Hockey Championships. As a result, Sweden's win was vacated, and Poland was awarded a 5–0 walkover win. Nilsson was suspended for the remainder of the tournament.

Awards and achievements
World Championship silver medalist (1973)
World Championship bronze medalist (1974)
WHA First All-Star Team (1976 and 1978)
Playoff MVP (WHA) (1976)
WHA Second All-Star Team (1977)
Avco Cup (WHA Championship) (1976 and 1978)
WHA all-time leader in career assists per game (1.15)
Viking Award (best Swedish hockey player playing in North America) 1978
Played in the Canada Cup (1976 and 1981)
Played in the Challenge Cup (1979)
New York Rangers Players' Player Award (1979)
“Honoured Member” of the Manitoba Hockey Hall of Fame
Inaugural member of the World Hockey Association Hall of Fame.

Career statistics

Regular season and playoffs

International

See also

Islanders–Rangers rivalry

References

External links

Ulf Nilsson's biography at Manitoba Hockey Hall of Fame

1950 births
Living people
Swedish ice hockey centres
Doping cases in ice hockey
New York Rangers players
Winnipeg Jets (WHA) players
Swedish expatriate ice hockey players in Canada
Swedish expatriate ice hockey players in the United States
Swedish sportspeople in doping cases
People from Nynäshamn Municipality
Undrafted National Hockey League players
Sportspeople from Stockholm County